The Prehistoric Man Museum is a museum of prehistory in Kibbutz Ma'ayan Baruch, Israel.

The museum showcases historical artifacts found in and around the kibbutz and houses an extensive collection of prehistoric tools and vessels, including hand axes predating human settlement in the Hulah Valley, around 780,000 BCE.

The museum's collection includes the skeleton of a prehistoric woman, approximately 50 years old, buried with her dog.

The museum also has an ethno-geographic wing with a collection of artifacts and tools from around the world, all made from natural or organic material.

See also
List of museums in Israel

References

External links 

 Museum website (Hebrew)
 Slide show
 The dog skeleton in Nature 1978

History museums in Israel
Archaeological museums in Israel
Modernist architecture in Israel
Archaeology of the Near East
Museums in Northern District (Israel)
1952 establishments in Israel
Museums established in 1952
Hula Valley